Tristan (Latin/Brythonic: Drustanus), also known as Tristram or Tristain and similar names, is the hero of the legend of Tristan and Iseult. In the legend, he is tasked with escorting the Irish princess Iseult to wed Tristan's uncle, King Mark of Cornwall. Tristan and Iseult accidentally drink a love potion during the journey and fall in love, beginning an adulterous relationship that eventually leads to Tristan's banishment and death. The character's first recorded appearance is in retellings of British mythology from the 12th century by Thomas of Britain and Gottfried von Strassburg, and later in the Prose Tristan. He is featured in Arthurian legends, including the seminal text Le Morte d'Arthur, as a skilled knight and a friend of Lancelot.

The historical roots of Tristan are unclear; his association with Cornwall may originate from the Tristan Stone, a 6th-century granite pillar in Cornwall inscribed with the name Drustanus (a variant of Tristan). He has been depicted in numerous historical and modern works of literature, music, and cinema. Richard Wagner's influential 19th-century opera Tristan und Isolde portrays Tristan as a doomed romantic figure.

Tristan

In the story of Tristan and Iseult, Tristan is the nephew of King Mark of Cornwall, sent to fetch Iseult back from Ireland to wed the king. However, he and Iseult accidentally consume a love potion while en route and fall helplessly in love. The pair then undergo numerous trials that test their secret affair, before the tragic end.

Tristan made his first recorded appearance in the 12th century in British mythology circulating in the north of France and the Kingdom of Brittany, which had close ancestral and cultural links with Wales, Cornwall and Devon by way of the ancient British kingdom of Dumnonia, as made clear in the story itself, and the closely related Cornish and Breton languages, both of which are P-Celtic like Welsh. Although the oldest stories concerning Tristan are lost, some of the derivatives still exist. 

Most early versions fall into one of two branches: the "courtly" branch represented in the retellings in Thomas of Britain's Tristan and his German successor Gottfried von Strassburg, and in the Folie Tristan d'Oxford; and the "common" branch, including the works of medieval French literature. 

Arthurian romancer Chrétien de Troyes mentioned in his poem Cligès that he composed his own account of the story; however, there are no surviving copies or records of any such text. In the 13th century, during the great period of prose romances, Tristan en prose or Prose Tristan became one of the most popular romances of its time. This long, sprawling, and often lyrical work (the modern edition takes up thirteen volumes) follows Tristan from the traditional legend into the realm of King Arthur where Tristan participates in the Quest for the Holy Grail. Its great success spawned many Italian (such as the Tavola Ritonda) and other rewrites. Among these was the French Post-Vulgate Cycle that combined it with a shortened version of the Vulgate Cycle, elements of which itself had been earlier used in the Prose Tristan.

Name
The ancient Brittonic name Tristan appears to mean "clanking swords of iron". The more recent Romance languages version, including French, has been paretymologically associated with "sadness" (compare Latin tristis "sad", Old French triste "sad"). In Gottfried von Strassburg's Tristan, when his mother, Blanschfleur, learns that her husband has been killed in battle, she dies in childbirth. The orphaned babe is named "Tristan" because of the sorrowful circumstances of his birth.  

The quasi-historical, semi-legendary Pictish Chronicle (probably late 10th century) presents several ancient Pictish kings by the name of Drest or Drust. The Picts are believed to have lived in present-day Scotland far to the northwest of Cornwall. The form Drustanus is merely Drust or hypocoristic Drustan rendered into Latin. The name may have originated with an ancient legend regarding a Pictish king who slew a giant in the distant past, which had spread throughout the Isles, it may come from a 6th-century Pictish saint Drostan who bore another form of the name, or it may have migrated northwards from the southwest due to the fame of the legends of Arthur. There was a Tristan who bore witness to a legal document at the Swabian Abbey of Saint Gall in 807.

The philologist Sigmund Eisner came to the conclusion that the name Tristan comes from Drust, son of Talorc. This Drust is probably otherwise unknown to us, because the sons of Pictish kings never became kings themselves. According to Eisner, the legend of Tristan as we know it was gathered together by an author living in North Britain around the early 8th century and associated with early Celtic monasticism. Eisner explains that Irish monks of this time would have been familiar with the Greek and Roman narratives that the legend borrows from, such as Pyramus and Thisbe. They would also have been familiar with the Celtic elements of the story such as in The Pursuit of Diarmuid and Gráinne. Eisner concludes that "the author of the Tristan story used the names and some of the local traditions of his own recent past. To these figures he attached adventures which had been handed down from Roman and Greek mythology. He lived in the north of Britain, was associated with a monastery, and started the first rendition of the Tristan story on its travels to wherever it has been found."

In Le Morte d'Arthur

Thomas Malory later shortened and incorporated the Prose Tristan into his own English-language The Book of Sir Tristram de Lyones (The Fyrste and the Secunde Boke of Syr Trystrams de Lyones), a part of Le Morte d'Arthur in which Tristan (Tristram) plays the role of a counter-hero to Lancelot. Of all the knights, Tristram most resembles Lancelot as he too loves a queen, the wife of another. Tristan is even considered to be as strong and able a knight as Lancelot, including the fulfillment of Merlin's prophecy for the two of them to engage in the greatest duel between any knights before or after, although neither kills the other and they become beloved friends. "[T]he depiction of their chivalric prowess eclipses, for large sections of the narratives, their love for their respective queens." His other friends and companions include Dinadan and Lamorak.

In Malory's telling, following the Prose Tristan, the mother of Tristan, Queen Elizabeth, dies during childbirth while desperately searching for his father King Meliodas after he was kidnapped by an enchantress (of a fairy kind in the original, unspecified by Malory) to be her lover. The young Tristan meets and falls in love with Isolde (Iseult) early on. His uncle, King Mark, jealous of Tristan and seeking to undermine him, seeks marriage to Isolde for just such a hateful purpose, going so far as to ask Tristram to go and seek her hand on his behalf (which Tristran, understanding that to be his knightly duty, does). Because of Mark's treacherous behaviour, Tristran takes Isolde from him and lives with her for some time in Lancelot's castle Joyous Gard, but he then returns Isolde to Mark. Nonetheless, Mark ends up ambushing and mortally injuring Tristram while he is harping (Tristan is noted in the book as one of the greatest of musicians and falconers), using a lance that had been given to him by the vengeful enchantress Morgan, whose lover had been slain by Tristan.

Differences between versions

Thomas of Britain draws on the Roman de Brut for historical details, and follows its example in matters of style. Gottfried draws more on the learned tradition of medieval humanism than on the chivalric ethos shared by his literary contemporaries. 

Tristan was originally the son of Queen Blancheflor and King Rivalen. In later versions since the Prose Tristan, his parents are Queen Isabelle (Malory's Elizabeth, known as Eliabel or Eliabella in Italy) and King Meliodas of Lyonesse.

Historical roots

Béroul's Norman French Romance of Tristan and Iseult, possibly the earliest extant version, is notable for its very specific geographical locations in Cornwall. Another strange aspect is Tristan's home-kingdom, Lyonesse, for whose existence there is no evidence. However, there were two places called Leonais: one in Brittany, the other the Old French transcription of Lothian. Regardless, Tristan being a prince of Lothian would make his name more sensible, Lothian being on the borderlands of the Pictish High-Kingship (and once a part of Pictish territory; Tristan may in fact have been a Pictish prince under a British king). There are also records of a Turstan Crectune, whose name gave the Lothian village of  Crichton its name. King David I of Scotland granted lands to Turstan Crectune in 1128. One other suggestion sees Tristan as adopted into the family of Mark of Cornwall – a historical practice attested in Roman law.

The Tristan Stone

Possible evidence for his roots in South West England is the 6th-century inscribed granite pillar known as The Tristan Stone, or The Longstone (meaning long stone), set beside the road leading to Fowey in Cornwall. It measures some 2.7 m (7 feet) in height and has been set in a modern concrete base. Until the 1980s it was in its original position some yards from the coastal road in a field near the turn down to the small harbour of Polkerris. It was then closer to Castle Dore and may have been the origin of the association of this site with the story of the tragic love of Tristan and Iseult. There is a Tau cross on one side and a Latin inscription on the other side, now much worn, reading:

DRVSTANVS HIC IACITCVNOMORI FILIVS
[Drustanus lies here, son of Cunomorus]

It has been suggested, and is confidently asserted on the plaque by the stone, that the characters referred to are Tristan, of which Drustan is a variant and Cynvawr Latinized to Cunomorus. Cynvawr, in turn, is said by the 9th-century author Nennius, who compiled an early pseudo-historical account of King Arthur, to be identified with King Mark known in alias 'QVONOMORVS'. Around 1540, John Leland recorded a third line now missing: CVM DOMINA OUSILLA ('with the lady Ousilla': Ousilla is conceivably a latinisation of the Cornish Eselt), but missed the badly weathered first line ('DRUSTANVS HIC IACIT') which has led Craig Weatherhill to speculate that this third line could have been lost by stone fracture, but which has also led Goulven Peron to propose to see 'OUSILLA' as a particular reading of 'DRUSTANVS'.

Modern works
From 1857 to 1859, Richard Wagner composed the opera Tristan and Isolde, now considered one of the most influential pieces of music of the 19th century. In his work, Tristan is portrayed as a doomed romantic figure.
Algernon Charles Swinburne wrote an epic poem Tristram of Lyonesse.
The legend of Tristan has been represented through the song of the same name by English singer-songwriter Patrick Wolf, and was the lead single from his 2005 album, Wind in the Wires.
Tristan plays a prominent role in the comic book series Camelot 3000, in which he is reincarnated in the year 3000, as a woman and subsequently struggles to come to terms with his new body, sexuality, and identity, reconciling them in turn with his previous notions of gender roles.
In 1983, Russian composer Nikita Koshkin wrote a classical guitar solo entitled "Tristan Playing the Lute", evoking the spirit of Tristan from the legend of "Tristan and Isolde", initially set in a playful adaptation of traditional English lute music.
In The Warlord Chronicles novel series by Bernard Cornwell, Tristan is the young heir to Kernow and the son of King Mark. He is the best friend of the protagonist Derfel Cadarn and a loyal ally of Arthur. Eventually, however, in an agonising decision for the sake of peace and out of his deep belief in royal legitimacy, Arthur betrays Tristan and Iseault when they seek refuge and leaves them to be killed by King Mark.
In the 2004 film, King Arthur, based on the Sarmatian connection theory of origin for the Arthurian legends, Tristan (Mads Mikkelsen) is a prominent member of the knights, who are Sarmatians serving under a half-Roman Arthur in the 5th century. Tristan is a cavalry archer, able to make amazing shots with his Parthian/Eurasian-style reflex composite bow. He uses a Chinese sword and holds true to the style, armour, and weapons, of a Sarmatian mounted archer. After many injuries, he dies a heroic death at the hand of the Saxon king Cerdic in single combat at the Battle of Badon Hill.
The 2006 film Tristan & Isolde starred James Franco as Tristan, Thomas Sangster as the child Tristan and Sophia Myles as Isolde, written by Dean Georgaris and directed by Kevin Reynolds.
The 2008 TV show Merlin depicts Tristan and his partner Isolde as smugglers in the Season 4 finale "The Sword in the Stone" parts 1 & 2. They help Arthur, Merlin, and the Knights regain Camelot after Morgana takes over. In the end, Isolde is killed by Helios, Morgana's henchman, but nothing is said of what happens with Tristan.
In the manga series Four Knights of the Apocalypse, Tristan is one of the titular knights, son of Meliodas and Elizabeth of Liones.

See also

Auchinleck manuscript
Palamedes
Medieval hunting (terminology)
Tristram the Younger

References

External links

 Transcription and page images of the Auchinleck manuscript
 Bibliography of Modern Tristaniana in English
 Béroul's Le Roman de Tristan
 Thomas d'Angleterre's Tristan
 Modern English verse translation of Gottfried von Strassburg's Tristan
 Sir Tristrem translated and retold in modern English prose, the story from Edinburgh, National Library of Scotland MS Advocates 19.2.1 (the Auchinleck MS) (translated and retold from University of Rochester, Middle English Text Series – Texts Online: Middle English from Alan Lupack (Ed), 1994, Lancelot of the Laik and Sir Tristrem, Medieval Institute Publications for TEAMS).

Arthurian characters
Knights of the Round Table
Medieval French romances
Tristan